Mirador may refer to:

Places
 Mirador, Maranhão, a municipality in Maranhão, Brazil
 Mirador, Paraná, a municipality in Paraná, Brazil
 Mirador, Arizona, a place in Arizona, US
 Mirador, California, a place in California, US
 Mirador (Greenwood, Virginia), a historic home
 El Mirador, a large pre-Columbian settlement in Guatemalań
 Mirador Basin, a geological depression in the northern department of Petén, Guatemala
 El Mirador cave (Cueva del Mirador), a cave in the Atapuerca Mountains, Spain
 Mount Mirador, a mountain in the Philippines
 Mount Tlaloc (Cerro Tláloc or El Mirador), a mountain in central Mexico
 Quinta El Mirador, a village in Argentina

Music
 Mirador (Magnum album)
 Mirador (Tarnation album)
 "Mirador" (song), a 1989 song by Johnny Hallyday

Literature
 , a literature, art and politics weekly that was published in Barcelona between 1929 and 1938, see El Be Negre
 The Mirador (novel) a novel by Sarah Monette

Other uses
 El Mirador Airport, an airport in Chile
 Mirador mine, a large copper mine in Ecuador
 Mirador Volleyball, a Dominican Republic volleyball club
 Parque El Mirador, a football stadium in Puebla, Mexico
 Mirador (software), an image viewer optimized to display IIIF resources
 Mirador, a video game by Sauropod Studio, the developers of Castle Story
 Mirador (architecture), a type of room in Moorish and Spanish architecture